Muzik was a British music magazine.

Muzik may also refer to:

 Muzik, a song by 4minute
 Mike Paradinas (born 1971), British musician known under the name "μ-Ziq"
 "Muzik", song from the 2002 rap EP L.A. Confidential Presents: Knoc-turn'al
 Muzik FM (formerly Radio Muzik), Malaysia's first FM radio station
Jiří Mužík (born 1 September 1976), Czech hurdler
 Muzik night club in Toronto's Horticulture Building

See also 
 Music